Andrew Spottiswoode (19 February 1787 – 20 February 1866) was a Scottish printer, publisher and politician, MP for  from 1826 to 1830, and  from 1830 to 1831.

Life
He was the fourth son of John Spottiswoode (died 1805) of Spottiswoode, Berwick and Margaret Penelope Strahan, daughter of William Strahan. He was educated at Edinburgh High School. The family descended from John Spottiswoode (1565–1639), archbishop of St. Andrews and lord chancellor of Scotland.

Spottiswoode lived at 9 Bedford Square, London and Broome Hall, Surrey.

A. and R. Spottiswoode
In 1819 Andrew and his brother Robert took over the running of the printing business of their uncle Andrew Strahan. They brought in steam-powered printing presses. They were also publishers, of works by Henry Fuseli and William Henry Pyne among others, including Anna Eliza Bray's memoir of her husband Charles Alfred Stothard.

King's Printer

In 1830, Strahan was granted a renewed 30-year patent as King's Printer. It resulted in a successful petition against Spottiswoode's election in Colchester, on the grounds that he was a government contractor. The monopoly it conferred was also attacked by Joseph Hume, a Radical colleague of Daniel Whittle Harvey to whom Spottiswoode had come second in Colchester (which elected two members). Hume made allegations about the patent, beginning a period in which the status of the monopoly was brought into play.

Spottiswoode gave evidence on Bible printing costs to a parliamentary committee in 1832, as did David Hunter Blair who held the Scottish patent as King's Printer. An attack on him by the Baptist minister Thomas Curtis, on the grounds of inaccurate printing, appeared in 1833.

Family
Spottiswoode married Mary (1801–1870), daughter of Thomas Norton Longman, the printer; they had two sons and three daughters. One of the sons was the mathematician and physicist William Spottiswoode.

References

1787 births
1866 deaths
Members of the Parliament of the United Kingdom for constituencies in Cornwall
Members of the Parliament of the United Kingdom for English constituencies
MPs for rotten boroughs
Andrew
UK MPs 1826–1830
UK MPs 1830–1831